Jamstix is a VST instrument produced by Rayzoon Technologies.

Concept
Jamstix combines the features of a drum sample player, arranger, and rhythm generator into a single plugin, allowing the user various workflows ranging from manually triggering drum sounds to programming and arranging grooves all the way to having Jamstix create grooves on-the-fly using sophisticated style and human drummer modeling. It can also adjust its playing to the audio or MIDI input for interactive jams.

Jamstix features limb simulation to ensure its output is always humanly playable, freeing the user from manual editing of MIDI data.

Features
 VSTi 2.4 compliant virtual instrument with 1 to 17 separate outputs and MIDI-to-host output + MIDI drag-&-drop
 Internal, expandable drum sample playback engine with adjustable per-sample ambiance
 Can sub hosts a separate drum VSTi (i.e. EZdrummer, BFD or DFHS)
 Can mix-&-match its own sounds with a sub-hosted drum plugin
 70 styles and 17 drummers are modeled in-depth in real-time by an A.I. system and not static patterns
 Limb-centric bar editor allows fine-control over every composed event
 unlimited parts song arranger stays synced with host and controls repetitions and fills
 Flexible Input-Output MIDI mapping with velocity translation to match any VSTi key layout and character
 Supported sample rates: 44.1 – 96 kHz
 Copy protection: License Key

See also
 Virtual Studio Technology
 Softsynth

External links
 Sound on Sound Review, November 2005
 Electronic Musician Review, March 2006
 Remix Magazine Review, January 2008

Software drum machines
Software synthesizers